The Dark Imbalance (also known as A Dark Imbalance in the United States) is a 2001 science fiction novel by Sean Williams and Shane Dix. It is the third novel in the Evergence series and is preceded by The Dying Light which was published in 2000. It follows the story of Morgan Roche who has been given the task to protect mankind from the cloned warriors.

Background
The Dark Imbalance was first published in Australia on 28 February 2001 by Voyager in paperback format. In March and April 2001 it was released in the United States and United Kingdom respectively. The Dark Imbalance won the 2001 Aurealis Award for best science fiction novel.

References

External links

2001 Australian novels
Australian science fiction novels
2001 science fiction novels
Aurealis Award-winning works
Voyager Books books